Bishop Kaun is an American professional wrestler. He is currently signed to Ring of Honor (ROH), where he wrestles under the ring name Kaun and is a member of The Embassy stable. He is currently one-third of the ROH World Six-Man Tag Team Champions with his Embassy stablemates, Brian Cage and Toa Liona. He has also wrestled for ROH's parent company All Elite Wrestling (AEW).

Professional wrestling career 
Kaun was trained at the Maryland Championship Wrestling professional wrestling school, debuting in 2017. He spent the early years of his career primarily wrestling for Maryland Championship Wrestling, where he won the MCW Tag Team Championship with Malcolm Moses. 

Kaun debuted in Ring of Honor in 2018, teaming with Moses as the Soldiers of Savagery. In 2021, he and Moses formed the stable Shane Taylor Promotions with Shane Taylor. In February 2021, the trio defeated MexiSquad to win the ROH World Six-Man Tag Team Championship. They held the title until December 2021 when they lost to the Righteous. On April 1, 2022, on Supercard of Honor XV, Tully Blanchard announced that Kaun would be part of his Tully Blanchard Enterprises stable, alongside Toa Liona and Brian Cage. On July 23, 2022, at Death Before Dishonor, Prince Nana announced he had purchased Tully Blanchard Enterprises and reformed The Embassy, with Cage, Kaun and Liona. They would go on to defeat the team of Alex Zayne, Blake Christian and Tony Deppen during the preshow. At Final Battle, The Embassy defeated Dalton Castle and The Boys, to win the ROH World Six-Man Tag Team Championships.

Kaun debuted in All Elite Wrestling in December 2021, wrestling on AEW Dark: Elevation.

Personal life 
Kaun is of Cameroonian descent on his father's side.

Championships and accomplishments 
Maryland Championship Wrestling
MCW Tag Team Championship (1 time) – with Malcolm Moses

Ring of Honor
ROH World Six-Man Tag Team Championship  (2 times, current) – with Moses and Shane Taylor (1) and Brian Cage and Toa Liona (1, current)

References

External links 
 
 
 

1986 births
African-American male professional wrestlers
American male professional wrestlers
American people of Cameroonian descent
Living people
People from Minneapolis
Professional wrestlers from Minneapolis
ROH World Six-Man Tag Team Champions
All Elite Wrestling personnel